The North African elephant shrew (Petrosaltator rozeti) or North African sengi is a species of elephant shrew in the family Macroscelididae. It is found in Algeria, Libya, Morocco, and Tunisia, and (since the extinction of the North African elephant) is the only extant afrotherian within its range. The species was formerly classified in the genus Elephantulus, but molecular evidence indicates that it is more closely related to Petrodromus than to other members of Elephantulus. It was moved to a new genus, Petrosaltator, in 2016.
The split with Petrodromus likely occurred during the Miocene period.

Description
The North African elephant-shrew is a little rodent-like in appearance, having a small body, large ears, and a long tail. The fur on the upper body varies from yellowish brown to pale sandy-pink, and the fur on the underside is white. It has a long flexible snout, typical of the elephant-shrews, which can be moved in a circular fashion and the nostrils are located towards the tip of the snout, with long sensory whiskers growing at the base of the snout. The rear legs are longer than the forelimbs, an adaptation for running and jumping. North African elephant-shrews use well-developed glands, placed under the tail, for marking territory.

Distribution
It is present in northwestern Africa from the northern Western Sahara to western Libya.

Habitat
Its natural habitats are Mediterranean-type shrubby vegetation and deserts.

Habits
The North African sengi typically gives birth to litters of 1 to 4 young twice a year.

Notes

References

Elephant shrews
Mammals of North Africa
Mammals described in 1833
Taxa named by Georges Louis Duvernoy
Taxonomy articles created by Polbot
Taxobox binomials not recognized by IUCN